Cyathopodium is a genus of soft corals in the family Clavulariidae.

References

External links 

 
 

Octocorallia genera
Clavulariidae